This list of rivers of the Americas by coastline includes the major coastal rivers of the Americas arranged by country.  A link to a map of rivers with known coordinates is listed at right. The ocean coasts are demarcated as follows:  
Arctic Ocean coast (including Hudson Bay) from Cape Prince of Wales east to Cape Chidley
Atlantic Ocean coast from Cape Chidley south to Cape Virgins
Pacific Ocean coast from Cape Prince of Wales south to Cape Virgins
Endorheic basin coast (drainage basins not reaching oceans)

This is a counterpart to the primarily alphabetical List of rivers of the Americas and other lists of rivers of countries, although only rivers which reach the ocean are included here, not tributaries.

Arctic Ocean coast

In the Americas, only the United States, Canada, and Greenland have rivers on the Arctic Ocean coast.  Greenland is surrounded by the Barents Sea (part of the Arctic Ocean), the Greenland Sea (often described as part of the Arctic Ocean), Baffin Bay to the west (marginal sea of the Arctic Ocean), the Labrador Sea to the south (part of the Arctic Ocean), and directly to the Arctic Ocean to the north.  The following is a list of rivers flowing into the Arctic Ocean.  The province and country where the mouth is located are included.

Atlantic Ocean coast

The Atlantic Ocean has irregular coasts indented by numerous bays, gulfs and seas. These include the Baltic Sea, Black Sea, Caribbean Sea, Davis Strait, Denmark Strait, part of the Drake Passage, Gulf of Mexico, Labrador Sea, Mediterranean Sea, North Sea, Norwegian Sea, almost all of the Scotia Sea, and other tributary water bodies.

The rivers in the following sections flow into the Atlantic Ocean, unless indicated otherwise.  The rivers of Cuba and several other countries flow into the Caribbean Sea which connects to the Atlantic Ocean.  Some rivers also flow into the Gulf of Mexico before the water reaches the main Atlantic Ocean.  A few of the major, notable rivers flowing into the Caribbean and Gulf of Mexico are included below.  These lists contain rivers with Wikipedia articles and a few other well-documented rivers.

Argentina, Atlantic Ocean coast

Bahamas, Caribbean Sea, Atlantic Ocean coast
While there are many tidal creeks in The Bahamas, the Goose River is the only river.  Its mouth is on the Caribbean Sea.

Barbados, Caribbean Sea, Atlantic Ocean coast
The following rivers in Barbados flow to the Atlantic Ocean.
 Bruce Vale River, Saint Andrew Parish, 
 Joes River, Saint Joseph Parish, 
 Long Pond River, Saint Andrew Parish, 

The following rivers in Barbados flow to the Caribbean Sea.
 Constitution River, Saint Michael Parish, 
 Indian River, Saint Michael Parish,

Belize, Caribbean Sea, Atlantic Ocean coast
All coastal rivers in Belize drain to the Caribbean Sea before going into the Atlantic Ocean.

Brazil, Atlantic Ocean coast

Canada, Atlantic Ocean coast
Canadian coastal river basins flow towards either the Arctic Ocean, Atlantic Ocean, or Pacific Ocean.  The major Canadian rivers with their mouth on the Atlantic Ocean coast are included in the list below.  The Province where the mouth is located is also given.

Bald Head River, Newfoundland and Labrador, 
Barrington River, Nova Scotia, 
LaHave River, Nova Scotia, 
Mersey River, Nova Scotia, 
Saint John, New Brunswick, Bay of Fundy
St. Lawrence River, Quebec, 
St. Mary's River, Nova Scotia,

Colombia, Caribbean Sea, Atlantic Ocean coast
Colombian rivers with their mouth on the Caribbean Sea, Atlantic Ocean coast include:
Magdalena River, Colombia, Caribbean Sea,

Costa Rica, Atlantic Ocean coast
All Costa Rican drainage basins flow to either the Caribbean Sea or the Pacific Ocean.

Cuba, Caribbean Sea, Atlantic Ocean coast
All Cuban coastal rivers have their mouth on the Caribbean Sea, including the following major river:
 Cauto River, Caribbean Sea

Dominican Republic, Caribbean Sea, Atlantic Ocean coast
The following rivers of the Dominican Republic have their mouth on the Atlantic Ocean:
Dajabón River, 
Yaque del Norte River,

French Guiana, Atlantic Ocean coast
Rivers of French Guiana where the mouth is on the Atlantic Ocean coast include the following:

Approuague, 
Counamama (near Iracoubo), 
Kourou, 
Mahury, 
Maroni, 
Mana,  
Oyapock, 
Rivière de Cayenne, 
Sinnamary,

Guyana, Atlantic Ocean coast
Rivers of Guyana where the mouth is on the Atlantic Ocean coast include the following:

Abary River, 
Berbice River, 
Courantyne River, 
Demerara River, 
Essequibo River, 
Mahaica River, 
Mahaicony River, 
Moruka River, 
Pomeroon River,  
Waini River,

Haiti, Caribbean Sea, Atlantic Ocean coast
Coastal rivers of Haiti have their mouths on the Caribbean Sea, including:
Artibonite River, Caribbean Sea,

Honduras, Caribbean Sea, Atlantic Ocean coast
Coastal rivers of Honduras flow into either the Caribbean Sea or Pacific Ocean.

Mexico, Atlantic Ocean coast
Coastal rivers of Mexico include Pacific Ocean coastal rivers and the following river with its mouth on the Gulf of Mexico. 
Rio Grande, United States, Mexico, Gulf of Mexico,

Nicaragua, Caribbean Sea, Atlantic Ocean coast
Coastal rivers of Nicaragua with their mouth on the Caribbean Sea, Atlantic Ocean include:

Coco River, 
Escondido River, 
Indio River, 
Kukalaya River, 
Kukra River, 
Kurinwás River, 
Layasiksa River, 
Maíz River, 
Prinzapolka River, 
Punta Gorda River,  
Río Grande de Matagalpa, 
San Juan River, 
Ulang River, 
Wawa River, 
Wawasang River,

Panama, Caribbean Sea, Atlantic Ocean coast
Coastal rivers in Panama have their mouth on either the Caribbean Sea in the Atlantic or the Pacific Ocean.   Some of the rivers with their mouth on the Caribbean Sea include:
 Chagres River (Panama Canal), 
 Calovebora River, 
 Sixaola River,

Suriname, Atlantic Ocean coast
Coastal rivers of Suriname where the mouth is on the Atlantic Ocean coast include:

Coppename River, 
Courantyne River, 
Maroni River, 
Nickerie River, 
Saramacca River, 
Suriname River,

United States, Atlantic Ocean coast
The U.S. coastal rivers where the mouth is on the Atlanic Ocean coast include:

Uruguay, Atlantic Ocean coast
Coastal rivers of Uruguay where the mouth is on the Atlantic Ocean coast include:
Chuí Stream, Uruguay and Brazil, 
Río de la Plata, Uruguay,  
Uruguay River, Uruguay and Argentina,

Venezuela, Atlantic Ocean coast
Coastal rivers of Venezuela have their mouth on either the Atlantic Ocean or the Caribbean Sea.  The Orinoco River flows into the Delta Amacuro at its mouth.   The Delta empties into the  Gulf of Paría and the Atlantic Ocean.  Venezuelan rivers with their mouth on the Atlantic Ocean coast include:

Essequibo River, 
Orinoco River, Venezuela and  Colombia, 
Tocuyo River, 
Unare River,

Pacific Ocean coast
Coastal rivers in the following sections by country have their mouth on the Pacific Ocean coast.

Canada, Pacific Ocean coast
Canadian rivers flowing into the Pacific Ocean include the following:

Fraser River, British Columbia, 
Skeena River, British Columbia,

Chile, Pacific Ocean coast
The coastal rivers (Río) in Chile that have their mouth on the Pacific Ocean include:

Aconcagua River, 
Bío-Bío River, 
Cautín River, 
Elqui River, 
Itata River, 
Loa River, 
Maipo River, 
Maule River, 
Maullín River, 
Palena River, 
Reñihue River, 
Río Bueno River, 
Toltén River, 
Valdivia River, 
Yelcho River,

Colombia, Pacific Ocean Coast

Coastal rivers in Colombia flow into the Pacific Ocean or Caribbean Sea.  Rivers flowing into the Pacific Ocean include the following:

 Anchicayá River, 
 Baudó River, 
 Dagua River, 
 Guapi River, 
 Iscuandé River, 
 Mira River (Colombia and Ecuador), 
 Naya River, 
 Patía River, 
 Tapaje River, 
 San Juan River,  
 San Juan de Micay River, 
 Sanquianga River, 
 Yurumanguí River,

Costa Rica, Pacific Ocean Coast

Abangares River, 
Aranjuez River, 
Barranca River, 
Coto Colorado River, 
Río Ceibo, 
Chacuaco River
Claro River (Costa Rica), 
Colón River
Conte River, 
Diamante River (Costa Rica)
Guacimal River, 
Jaba River (Costa Rica), 
Jesús María River, 
Lagarto River, 
Limón River (Costa Rica)
Naranjo River (Costa Rica), 
Nosara River, 
La Palma River, 
Negro River (Costa Rica)
Pirris River, 
Rincón River, 
Riyito River (Costa Rica)
Savegre River, 
Sierpe River, 
Síngrí River, 
Tamarindo River, Costa Rica, 
Tárcoles River, 
Tempisque River, Gulf of Nicoya, 
Térraba River,  
Tigre River (Costa Rica), 
Volcán River (Costa Rica),

Ecuador, Pacific Ocean Coast

 Arenillas River, 
 Balao River, 
 Cañar River, 
 Cayapas River, 
 Coaque River, 
 Chone River, 
 Cojimies River, 
 Esmeraldas River, 
 Guayas River, Gulf of Guayaquil, 
 Jama River, 
 Jipijapa River, 
 Jubones River, 
 Mira River (Ecuador and Colombia border), 
 Muisne River, 
 Portoviejo River, 
 Zarumilla River (Peru and Ecuador border),

El Salvador, Pacific Ocean Coast

Banderas River, 
Cara Sucia River, 
Comalapa River, 
Copinula River, 
Goascorán River, 
Río Grande de San Miguel, 
El Guayabo River, 
Jalponga River, 
Jiboa River, 
Lempa River, 
El Molino River, 
Paz River, 
El Potrero River, 
Pululuya River, 
Sensunapan River, 
Sirama River,

Guatemala, Pacific Ocean Coast
The coastal rivers in Guatemala with their mouth on the Pacific Ocean coast include:

Acomé River, 
Achiguate River, 
Coyolate River, 
Icán River, 
Lempa River, 
Los Esclavos River, 
Madre Vieja River, 
María Linda River, 
Nahualate River, 
Naranjo River, 
Ocosito River, 
Paso Hondo River, 
Paz River, 
Samalá River, 
Suchiate River (Guatemala and Mexico),

Honduras, Pacific Ocean Coast

Choluteca River, 
Goascorán River, 
Lempa River,  
Nacaome River, 
Río Negro,

Mexico, Pacific Ocean Coast

Rivers of Mexico that have their mouth on the Pacific Ocean coast include the following.  The river's name, as well as Mexican State and coordinates where the mouth of the river is located are listed where known.

Nicaragua, Pacific Ocean Coast

Río Brito, 
Rio Casares
Río Escalante, Nicaragua, 
Estero Real, Chinandega, 
Río Negro, 
Río el Tamarindo, León, 
Río Tecolapa, Nicaragua,

Panama, Pacific Ocean Coast
The mouth of the following rivers in Panama are at the Pacific Ocean:

Rio Anton, 
Bahia de Parita, 
Rio Cabra, 
Rio Caimito, 
Rio Cate, 
Rio Chame, 
Rio Chepo (Bayano River), 
Rio Chiriquí Viejo, 
Rio Chorcha, 
Rio Colorado, 
Rio Congo, 
Rio Corotú, 
Rio Duablo, 
Estero de Ajo, 
Rio Farallon, 
Rio Fonseca, 
Rio Grande, 
Rio Guanábano, 
Rio Jaqué, 
Rio La Villa, 
Las Vueltas
Rio Lovaina, 
Rio Mariato, 
Rio Pacora, 
Rio Palo Blanco, 
Palo Seco, 
Rio Pavo, 
Rio Platanal, 
Puerto Pocrí (tidal creek), 
Rio Rabo de Puerco, 
Rio Sabanas, 
Rio Sambú, 
Rio San Bártolo, 
Rio San Pablo, 
Rio San Felix, 
Rio San Juan, 
Rio San Pedro, 
Rio Santa Maria, 
Rio Santiago, 
Rio Suay, 
Rio Tabasara, 
Rio Tuira, 
Rio Varadero,

Peru, Pacific Ocean Coast
The following coastal rivers in Peru have their mouth on the Pacific Ocean Coast:

Acarí River, 
Atico, 
Cañete River, 
Caplina River, 
Caravelí River, 
Casma River, 
Chamán River, 
Chancay River (Lambayeque), 
Chancay River (Huaral), 
Chao River, 
Chaparra River, 
Chicama River, 
Chillón River, 
Chira River, 
Colca River, 
Culebras River, 
Fortaleza River, 
Grande River (Rio Nazca), 
Huaura River, 
Huarmey River, 
Ica River, 
Rio Indio Muerto or Chala, 
Jequetepeque River, 
Lacramarca River, 
Rio Locumba, 
Lurín River, 
Mala River, 
Moche River, 
Motupe River,  
Nepeña River, 
Ocoña River, 
Olmos River, 
Omas River, 
Osmore River or Moquegua or Ilo, 
Pativilca River, 
Pisco River, 
Piura River, 
Rímac River, 
Sama River, 
Rio San Juan
Santa River, 
Supe River, 
Tambo River
Quebrada Topara, 
Tumbes River, 
Virú River, 
Vitor River, 
Yauca River, 
Zaña River, 
Zarumilla River,

United States, Pacific Ocean coast
The following coastal rivers of the United States have their mouth on the Pacific Ocean:

Endorheic basins

There are Endorheic basins in several regions of the Americas.  Rivers in these basins do not reach the oceans.  The largest endorheic basin is the Great Basin in North America.  There are also several endorheic basins in South America, including the Altiplano Basin .

See also
Arctic#Arctic waters
Geography of North America
Geography of South America

References

Americas-related lists
Americas, List of rivers of the, by coastline